Pselaphokentron is a genus of beetles in the family Mordellidae, containing the following species:

 Pselaphokentron aculeatum Franciscolo, 1990
 Pselaphokentron bradypygum Franciscolo, 1955
 Pselaphokentron brunneipenne Ermisch, 1969

References

Mordellidae